County Road 44 is a county road which runs from the town of Flekkefjord in Vest-Agder county to the city of Stavanger in Rogaland county. The section of the road between Søyland and Ogna in the municipality of Hå has, together with almost all of County Road 507, been designated as National Tourist Routes for the landscape of Jæren. The route follows the North Sea coastline of south-western Norway, and passes mile long beaches, some of Norway's best tended farmlands with its typical dry stone walls, some notable lighthouses and other buildings of cultural significance.

References

044
Roads in Rogaland
Roads in Agder
National Tourist Routes in Norway